This is the July–September part of the 2010 ITF Women's Circuit.

Key

July

August

September

See also 
 2010 ITF Women's Circuit
 2010 ITF Women's Circuit (January–March)
 2010 ITF Women's Circuit (April–June)
 2010 ITF Women's Circuit (October–December)
 2010 WTA Tour

 07-09